The Caen tramway is a tram in the city of Caen, France.
The tram opened on 27 July 2019 and replaced the Caen Guided Light Transit (TVR) that closed in December 2017. The tramway uses the same route as the TVR, with a short new branch to Presqu'île and a with a new tram depot in Fleury-sur-Orne.

History
The Caen Guided Light Transit (Caen TVR) opened in 2002 after 3 years of construction. 

Viacités confirmed on 14 December 2011 its plans to abandon the TVR in favour of a conventional tramway by 2019, due to its unreliability. The conversion to light rail also included the termination of two concession contracts that Keolis and Bombardier-Spie Batignolles consortium STVR hold. In late 2014, the French government pledged €23.3 million towards Caen's light rail conversion project, estimated to cost approximately €230 million. 

In December 2017, the TVR closed and construction work began. The new tramway opened on 27 July 2019. On 9 March 2021, it was announced that a new line will serve the west of Caen by 2028.

Network

Line T1
The Line T1 connects Hérouville-Saint-Clair and Ifs. It is 10.7 km long and has 25 stations. From Monday to Friday, the frequency of trams is 10 minutes between 7am and 7pm.

Line T2
The Line T2 connects the north of Caen and its Presqu'Île. It is 6.6 km long and has 17 stations. From Monday to Friday, the frequency is 10 minutes between 7am and 7pm.

Line T3
The Line T3 connects Caen and Fleury-sur-Orne. It is 5.3 km long and has 15 stations. From Monday to Friday, the frequency is 10 minutes between 7am and 7pm. An extension to Fleury - Hauts-de-l'Orne opened on 29 August 2022.

See also 
 Caen Guided Light Transit
 List of town tramway systems in France
 Trams in Caen

References 

Caen
Tram transport in France
Transport in Normandy
Town tramway systems by city
Railway lines opened in 2019
750 V DC railway electrification